Bembecinus tridens is a species of sand wasps belonging to the family Crabronidae.

Subspecies
 Bembecinus tridens caesius (Compte Sart, 1959)
 Bembecinus tridens tridens (Fabricius, 1781)

Description
The body is black and yellow.

Biology
These wasps fly in one generation from early June to late August. The females dig a unicellular nest, though a single female digs 1-8 nests in succession. After an egg is laid in the cell the prey item (various families of Homoptera) is introduced. The species is parasitized by Hedychrum chalybaeum.

Distribution and habitat
This species can be found from Western Europe and North Africa to Japan and China. They are common inhabitants of sandy areas.

Bibliography
 Nemkov P. G. (2012). Digger wasps of the genus Bembecinus A. Costa, 1859 (Hymenoptera, Crabronidae, Bembicinae) of the fauna of Russia and neighbouring countries. - Bembecinus A. Costa, 1859 (Hymenoptera, Crabronidae, Bembicinae)). // Far Eastern Entomologist. 2012. N 251. C. 1–11. ISSN 1026-051X
 Rolf Witt: Wespen. Beobachten, Bestimmen. Naturbuch-Verlag, Augsburg 1998, .

References

External links
 Bembecinus tridens - Biodiversity Heritage Library - Bibliography
 Bembecinus tridens - NCBI Taxonomy Database
 Bembecinus tridens - Global Biodiversity Information Facility
 Bembecinus tridens - Encyclopedia of Life

Crabronidae
Hymenoptera of Asia
Hymenoptera of Europe
Insects described in 1781